Francisco Tortellá (born 2 September 1937) is a Spanish former cyclist. He competed in the sprint and team pursuit events at the 1960 Summer Olympics.

References

External links
 

1937 births
Living people
Spanish male cyclists
Olympic cyclists of Spain
Cyclists at the 1960 Summer Olympics
Sportspeople from Mallorca
Cyclists from the Balearic Islands